Józef Zawadzki (July 14, 1886 in Warsaw – February 22, 1951 in Zalesie, near Warsaw) was a Polish physical chemist and technologist. Father of Tadeusz (Zośka) and Anna Zawadzka.

Zawadzki was a co-founder, President and Vice-President of the Polskie Towarzystwo Chemiczne. He was a professor (from 1923) and rector (1936–1939) of Warsaw University of Technology, and a member of the Polish Academy of Learning (since 1947).

The oldest and largest traditional lecture hall at the Warsaw University of Technology is named Prof.  Józef Zawadzki Auditorium.

Research

His main field of research was physicochemical fundamentals of chemical technology. He was researching contact oxidation of ammonia, naphthalene and anthracene, mechanism of ammonia oxidation on platinum at low temperatures, reduction of iron dioxide by a methane, methods of obtaining aluminium oxide from Polish kaolinite and aluminosilicate, use of Polish anhydrite and gypsum deposit to production sulfuric acid and cementum, kinematics of thermal dissociation.

Under the German occupation of Poland during World War II, he was involved in the clandestine operation of the Warsaw University of Technology. Together with Marceli Struszyński, Zawadzki analyzed captured German V-2 rocket for its fuel composition. In 1947, he was recognized with a Doctor Honoris Causa.

Mechanism of ammonia oxidation on platinum at low temperatures

The mechanism of ammonia oxidation on platinum at low temperature was postulated by F. Rachsig (1927) and later adapted by Zawadzki (1948, 1950) to proceed via formation on imide (NH). In this proposal formation of nitroxyl and hydrazine (N2H4) is involved:

 NH3 + O(a) → NH(a) + H2O
 NH(a) + O(a) → HNO(a) + *
 NH(a) + NH3 → N2H4(a)
 HNO(a) + NH3 → N2H4(a) + ½O2
 N2H4(a) + O2 → N2 + 2H2O + *

Later, Y. M. Fogel (1964) disproved the Zawadzki theory that NH is formed via the oxidation of ammonia. In his proposal, NO is an important intermediate of the reaction. The formation of N2O is not detected, therefore the mechanism does not involve its production.

Works
 Technologia chemiczna nieorganiczna vol. 1–2 (1948–1949)

Notes

References
 
 
 
 

1886 births
1951 deaths
Scientists from Warsaw
Warsaw University of Technology alumni
Academic staff of the Warsaw University of Technology
Polish physical chemists
Burials at Powązki Cemetery